Joint committee may refer to:

 Joint committee (legislative), a committee of members of both chambers of a bicameral 
Joint ministerial committee
 Joint committee (UK local government), a committee of council nominees in England
 Joint committee (diplomatic), a committee for the governance of treaties
 Joint Committee on Standards for Educational Evaluation, an American and Canadian based Standards Developer Organization
 Joint Committee (Germany), emergency parliament in Germany